Alena Coufalová Dřevjaná (born 4 July 1969 in Opava) is a former artistic gymnast who represented Czechoslovakia at the 1988 Summer Olympics, finishing seventh in the team final and 26th in the all-around final.

She finished ninth in the all-around final of the 1985 European Championships. At the Friendship Games in 1984, organized for the countries of the communist bloc instead of the 1984 Los Angeles Olympics, she won bronze medal in team competition and in the balance beam final.

Dřevjaná (married Coufalová) is mother of figure skaters Petr Coufal and Jana Coufalová and football player Vladimír Coufal.

References

External links
 
 
 
 

1969 births
Living people
Sportspeople from Opava
Czechoslovak female artistic gymnasts
Olympic gymnasts of Czechoslovakia
Gymnasts at the 1988 Summer Olympics